Gadus is a genus of demersal fish in the family Gadidae, commonly known as cod, although there are additional cod species in other genera. The best known member of the genus is the Atlantic cod.

Species
Today, three species in the genus are recognized:

Modern taxonomy included Alaska pollock (Gadus chalcogrammus), which is genetically not separate from Norway pollock. Greenland cod (G. ogac) that was considered an own species, is considered the same species as Pacific cod (G. macrocephalus).

References

External links

Codtrace 
fishbase.org - Scientific Names for Gadus
Fisheries Heritage website, Newfoundland and Labrador
Long term trends in Norwegian cod fisheries – the pioneers
Species factsheet on cod from the UK Sea Fish Industry Authority (PDF, 2MB)

 
Commercial fish
Taxa named by Carl Linnaeus
Marine fish genera